Charmahin (also Romanized as Charmahīn) is a village in Kachu Rural District, in the Central District of Ardestan County, Isfahan Province, Iran. At the 2006 census, its population was 55, in 21 families.

References 

Populated places in Ardestan County